Patrick Munro (9 October 1883 – 3 May 1942), also known as Pat Munro, was a Scotland international rugby union player and later a British Conservative politician.

Rugby union career

Amateur career

He was educated at Leeds Grammar School and Christ Church, Oxford, where he held an Open History Scholarship and graduated with 2nd class Honours in History. He was also awarded a Half Blue for High Jump in 1906 and President of the Vincent's Club (the club for Oxford Blues) in 1906–1907.

He played for Oxford University RFC.

Munro was a Rugby Blue in 1903, 1904, 1905 (and Captain in 1905)..

He also played for London Scottish FC.

Provincial career

He played for the Whites Trial side against the Blues Trial side on 21 January 1911, while still with London Scottish.

International career
Munro captained the team in 1907 and 1911.

Administrative career
He was President of the Scottish Rugby Union for the period 1939 to 1942.

Political career

Sudan
He joined the Sudan Political Service in 1907, and was Governor of Darfur Province in 1923-1924 and Governor of Khartoum Province from 1925 to 1929.

He was mentioned in dispatches in 1919 and awarded the Order of the Nile (3rd class) in 1929. He was a Member of British Delegation to the Capitulations Conference in Montreux in 1937.

Member of Parliament
He was Conservative Member of Parliament (MP) for Llandaff and Barry from 1931 until his death. He was Parliamentary Private Secretary to Capt. Euan Wallace when he was Under-Secretary of State for the Home Department in 1935 and then Secretary for Overseas Trade. Munro went on to be a Junior Government Whip in 1937, resigning in March 1942.

Joining the government payroll as a Junior Lord of the Treasury later that year and serving until his death.

Military service and death
Munro, a private in the Home Guard, died on 3 May 1942 whilst taking part in a military exercise at Westminster. The exercise was a simulation of a landing by airborne troops in central London in tandem with fifth-column activities as a test of Home Guard defences. As a member of the Palace of Westminster Home Guard, Munro was acting as a runner and was in the Liberal Whips' room with two company colleagues. It was there that he collapsed suddenly and died before he could be taken for aid.

He is buried Cathedine (St. Michael) Churchyard in Brecknockshire under the care of the Commonwealth War Graves Commission.

Family
Munro was the fifth son of Patrick Munro and Mary Helen Catherine Dormond.

Munro was married in 1911 to Jessie Margaret Munro of Bwlch in Wales.

See also

 List of Scottish rugby union players killed in World War II

References

Sources

 Bath, Richard (ed.) The Scotland Rugby Miscellany (Vision Sports Publishing Ltd, 2007 )
 Massie, Allan A Portrait of Scottish Rugby (Polygon, Edinburgh)

External links
 

1883 births
1942 deaths
Military personnel from Glasgow
Alumni of Christ Church, Oxford
Anglo-Scots
British Home Guard soldiers
British military personnel killed in World War II
Conservative Party (UK) MPs for Welsh constituencies
Members of the Parliament of the United Kingdom for Cardiff constituencies
Ministers in the Churchill wartime government, 1940–1945
Oxford University RFC players
People educated at Leeds Grammar School
Scotland international rugby union players
Scottish rugby union players
UK MPs 1931–1935
Presidents of the Scottish Rugby Union
Ministers in the Chamberlain wartime government, 1939–1940
Ministers in the Chamberlain peacetime government, 1937–1939
Whites Trial players
Sudan Political Service officers
Rugby union players from Partick